João de Oliveira Matos Ferreira (1 March 1879 – 29 August 1962) was a Portuguese Roman Catholic prelate and bishop who served in Guarda from his appointment in 1922 until his death. He was also the founder of the League of the Servants of Jesus.

The process for his beatification led on 3 June 2013 to Pope Francis declaring him Venerable as recognition of his life of heroic virtue. The pope must approve one miracle attributed to him in order for him to be beatified; one such case is now under investigation.

Life
João de Oliveira Matos Ferreira was born on 1 March 1879 in Portugal to Antonio de Oliveira Matos Ferreira. He had four brothers and one of those brothers was a priest.

He was ordained to the priesthood on 28 March 1903 and served as a personal assistant to the Archbishop of Braga. From 1920 to 1923 he was the Apostolic Visitor of Guarda. He was appointed as a bishop in the Guarda diocese on 11 December 1922. He was also made a Titular Bishop at the same time and received his episcopal consecration in 1923. He also went on to establish the League of the Servants of Jesus.

Ferreiradied on 29 August 1962.

Beatification process
The beatification process commenced on 29 November 1993 in Guarda and the local process spanned from 1994 until 1998; the process was ratified on 13 November 1998. The Positio was then forwarded to the Congregation for the Causes of Saints in Rome in 2008.

Pope Francis approved his life of heroic virtue and proclaimed him to be Venerable on 3 June 2013.

A miracle attributed to him was investigated and the process of investigation closed at the beginning of 2010. It was ratified on 19 November 2010.

References

External links
 Catholic Hierarchy 
 Hagiography Circle
 Saints SQPN

1879 births
1962 deaths
Venerated Catholics by Pope Francis
19th-century venerated Christians
20th-century venerated Christians
Bishops of Guarda